Kevin Breen is a former Irish wheelchair athlete. He won the second London Marathon men's wheelchair race in 1984, defeating second-place winner Mick Karaphillides, whose wheelchair broke during the race, and the previous champion Gordon Perry. In winning, he broke the previous course record by nearly one hour, setting a new record of 2:38:40. He also competed in athletics at the Summer Paralympic Games in 1984, 1988, and 1992.

References

External links
 

Year of birth missing (living people)
Living people
Irish male wheelchair racers
Paralympic athletes of Ireland
Paralympic wheelchair racers
Athletes (track and field) at the 1984 Summer Paralympics
Athletes (track and field) at the 1988 Summer Paralympics
Athletes (track and field) at the 1992 Summer Paralympics